Faridpur District is a district in south-central Bangladesh. It is a part of the Dhaka Division. It is bounded by the Padma River to its northeast. The district was named after Farīd-ud-Dīn Masʿūd, a 13th century Sufi saint. A separate district was created by severing Dhaka district in 1786 and was called Dacca Jelalpur. A municipality was established in 1869. Historically, the town was known as Fatehabad. It was also called Haveli Mahal Fatehabad.

History

Sultan Jalaluddin Muhammad Shah established a mint in Fatehabad during his reign in the early 15th century. Fatehabad continued to be a mint town of the Bengal Sultanate until 1538. In Ain-i-Akbari, it was named as Haweli Mahal Fatehabad during the reign of Emperor Akbar in the Mughal Empire. The Portuguese cartographer João de Barros mentioned it as Fatiabas. The Dutch map of Van den Brouck described it as Fathur.

Its first mention in Bengali literature was by Daulat Uzir Bahram Khan in his adaption of Layla and Majnun. The medieval poet Alaol was born in Faridpur.

Fathabad was a strategically important base in south and southwestern Bengal. It was a well-developed urban centre. The town was home to important Mughal government officials, including generals, civil servants and jagirdars. During the reign of Emperor Jahangir in the 17th century, local zamindars Satrajit and Mukund resisted the Mughal government. By the 19th century, the town was renamed as Faridpur in honour of the Sufi saint Shah Fariduddin Masud, a follower of the Chishti order of Ajmer. Haji Shariatullah and Dudu Miyan led the conservative Faraizi movement in Faridpur during the early 19th century.

The Faridpur District was established by the British in 1786. The Faridpur Subdivision was a part of Dacca Division in the Bengal Presidency established by the East India Company. The municipality of Faridpur was established in 1869. The subdivision covered modern day Faridpur, Rajbari, Madaripur, Shariatpur and Gopalganj districts (collectively known as Greater Faridpur). It was included in Eastern Bengal and Assam during the British Raj between 1905 and 1912.

Faridpur was a rail terminus for the Bengal Provincial Railway and the Eastern Bengal Railway, connecting Calcutta with the important Goalanda ghats, from where ships travelled to Colonial Assam and British Burma. British Faridpur was the birthplace of several nationalist leaders of the subcontinent, including Ambica Charan Mazumdar, Humayun Kabir, Maulvi Tamizuddin Khan, Sheikh Mujibur Rahman Syed Qumrul Islam Saleh Uddin,Syeda Sajeda Chowdhury and K.M.Obaidur Rahman. 
The acclaimed American engineer Fazlur Rahman Khan was also born in the region.

Faridpur saw intense fighting during the Bangladesh Liberation War in 1971. It was one of original 18 subdivisions of Bangladesh at the time of independence. In 1984, the devolution reforms of President Hussain Muhammad Ershad divided the old subdivision into five districts. In 2015, the Government of Bangladesh announced plans to establish a Faridpur Division.

Politics and local government
The district has 9 upazilas, 4 municipalities, 36 wards, 100 mahallahs, 79 unions and 1,899 villages. The district has four parliamentary constituencies in the Jatiyo Sangshad. The Faridpur District Council is the highest tier of local government.

List of upazilas
The district's nine upazilas:
 Alfadanga Upazila
 Bhanga Upazila
 Boalmari Upazila
 Charbhadrasan Upazila
 Faridpur Sadar Upazila
 Madhukhali Upazila
 Nagarkanda Upazila
 Sadarpur Upazila
 Saltha Upazila

Demographics

According to the 2022 Bangladesh census, Faridpur District had a population of 2,162,405 , of which 1,050,193 were males and 1,112,061 were females. Rural population was 1,641,869 (85.83%) while urban population was 271,100 (14.17%). Faridpur had a literacy rate of 48.96% for the population 7 years and above: 50.29% for males and 47.69% for females.

Muslims are the majority population with 90.49%, while Hindus are 9.43%. The Hindu population decreased from 1.95 lakh in 1981 to just over 1.8 lakh today.

Economy

Faridpur is an important centre of the jute trade and hilsa fish trade. Its industrial sector features numerous jute mills, sugar mills and a 50 MW thermal power plant.

In terms of transport, Faridpur is an important hub of the Bangladesh Railway, with its tracks connected to the Indian Railways in West Bengal. It is linked by road with Kushtia, Meherpur, Khulna, Barisal, and Jessore.

Culture and sport

Faridpur District has a rich heritage of folk music, including Baul, Marami, Bichar, Murshidi-Marfati, Fakirali, Gazirgan, Kabigan, Jarigan music. However many of these traditions are extinct. Major festivals include Eid, Nabanna, Pous Utshab, Rathjatra, Dol Purnima Utshab and Durga Puja. Folk festivities are held on the occasion of Annaprashana, Muharram, Bengali weddings, Jamai Shasthi, Bhadra Mangal Chandi. Folk games of the district include Dariabandha, boat racing, Ha-du-du and cock fighting.

Major contemporary and historical publications include Jagaran, Ganaman (1370 BS), Chashi Barta, Idaning, Thikana, Bhorer Runner, Faridpur (1997), Kumar (2006); Weekly: Kalbhabna (2004), Pragotir Din (1995), Boalmari Sangbad, Al Helal, Bhanga Khabar; Fortnightly: Nazir Bangla Defunct: Faridpur Darpan (1861), Chitrakar (1283 BS), Kohinoor (1896), Sanjay (1900),' Aryakayastha (1318 BS), Faridpur Hitoishi (1329 BS), Faridpur Angina (1329 BS), Barta (1926), Muazzen (1335 BS), The Servant of Humanity (1960), Siraj (1932), Langal (1932), Sheba (1350 BS), Khedmat (1373 BS), Jubashakti (1972), Weekly Bangladesh (1972), Satyajug (1975), Faridpur Barta (1979), Aakal (1979), Samachar (1980) and Bangla Sangbad (1982).

Education
There are several state owned colleges in the district. Several venerable British Raj-era educational institutions are located in the region, including the Rajendra College (1918), Government Saroda Sundori Mohila College (1966) Faridpur Zilla School (1840), Government Girls High School (1910), Madhukhali Pilot High School, George Academy (1911), M N Academy (1916), Bakiganj Islamia Madrasa (1922),  Hitoishi High School (1889), Bhanga Pilot High School (1889), Karakdi Rambihari Multilateral High School (1901) and Krishnapur High School (1910). The Faridpur Medical College was established in 1985. The Faridpur Engineering College was established in 2010. Faridpur High School was established in 1889.

See also
 Upazilas of Bangladesh
 Districts of Bangladesh
 Divisions of Bangladesh

Notes

References

External links

 "Faridpur". in Encyclopædia Britannica

 
Districts of Bangladesh
Districts of Bangladesh established before 1971